Murieta is a town and municipality located in the province and autonomous community of Navarre, northern Spain. It covers an area of 4,51 km². In 2006, it had a population of 371, giving the average population density of 70,29 persons per km².

References

External links
 MURIETA in the Bernardo Estornés Lasa - Auñamendi Encyclopedia (Euskomedia Fundazioa) 
 Official web of the town 

Municipalities in Navarre